Roy Walker may refer to:

 Roy Walker (baseball) (1893–1962), American Major League Baseball pitcher
 Roy Walker (production designer), British film production designer
 Roy Walker (comedian) (born 1940), television personality and comedian from Northern Ireland
 Roy Walker (footballer) (born 1957), football manager and former player from Northern Ireland
 "Roy Walker", a song by Belle & Sebastian from the album Dear Catastrophe Waitress

See also
Walker (surname)

Walker, Roy